In enzymology, a nicotinate dehydrogenase is an enzyme that catalyzes the chemical reaction

nicotinate + H2O + NADP+  6-hydroxynicotinate + NADPH + H+

The 3 substrates of this enzyme are nicotinate, H2O, and NADP+, whereas its 3 products are 6-hydroxynicotinate, NADPH, and H+.

Classification 

This enzyme belongs to the family of oxidoreductases, specifically those acting on CH or CH2 groups with NAD+ or NADP+ as acceptor.

Nomenclature 

The systematic name of this enzyme class is nicotinate:NADP+ 6-oxidoreductase (hydroxylating). Other names in common use include nicotinic acid hydroxylase, and nicotinate hydroxylase.

Biological role 

This enzyme participates in nicotinate and nicotinamide metabolism. It has 2 cofactors: FAD, and Iron.

References

 
 
 
 
 
 

EC 1.17.1
NADPH-dependent enzymes
Flavoproteins
Iron enzymes
Enzymes of unknown structure